Dawes Road Cemetery is a Jewish cemetery in Toronto, Ontario, Canada. It is located in Scarborough, on St. Clair Avenue east of Victoria Park Avenue. Established in 1903, it was the third Jewish cemetery in Toronto. The first cemeteries, the Pape Avenue Cemetery and Jones Avenue Cemetery, had been established in the eastern part of the city. Dawes Road Cemetery was also placed in what was then a rural area on the edge of the city. Since then some 13,000 people have been buried there, including 11 Canadian servicemen of World War II whose graves are registered by the Commonwealth War Graves Commission.

Notable Burial

 Samuel Shopsowitz, founder of Shopsy's Deli
 David Dunkelman (Sr.) founder of Tip Top Tailors

References

External links
Jewish history in stone

Jewish cemeteries in Toronto
Jews and Judaism in Toronto
1903 establishments in Ontario